The Romanche is a  long mountain river in southeastern France. It is a right tributary of the Drac, which is itself a tributary of the Isère. Its source is in the northern part of the Massif des Écrins, Dauphiné Alps. It flows into the Drac in Champ-sur-Drac, south of Grenoble. The road from Grenoble to Briançon over the Col du Lautaret runs through the Romanche valley. There are several mountain and ski resorts in the valley, including Alpe d'Huez, La Grave and Les Deux Alpes.

The Romanche flows through the following departments and towns:
 Hautes-Alpes: La Grave
 Isère: Mont-de-Lans, Le Bourg-d'Oisans, Livet-et-Gavet, Vizille

References

Rivers of France
Rivers of Provence-Alpes-Côte d'Azur
Rivers of Auvergne-Rhône-Alpes
Rivers of Hautes-Alpes
Rivers of Isère